Paul Daxhelet (25 November 1905 – 3 October 1993) was a Belgian painter. His work was part of the art competitions at the 1936 Summer Olympics and the 1948 Summer Olympics.

References

1905 births
1993 deaths
20th-century Belgian painters
Belgian painters
Olympic competitors in art competitions
People from Huy